Greater Manchester does not currently have an official flag. The former Greater Manchester County Council used a heraldic banner of its arms during its existence between 1974 and 1986.

Greater Manchester County Council

The flag of the Greater Manchester Metropolitan County Council was a symbol of the former Greater Manchester County Council which administered Greater Manchester in England between 1974 and 1986. It has not been registered with the Flag Institute, which will not register flags for counties other than for historic counties.

The flag was adopted by Greater Manchester County Council in 1974, and derives from the shield and crest design on the coat of arms of Greater Manchester; the design itself is used by a number of organisations that represent the Greater Manchester area, such as the former Greater Manchester County Council, the Greater Manchester Fire and Rescue Service, and the Greater Manchester Army Cadet Force.

Description
The flag is composed of ten golden castles (arranged in rows of 3–2–3–2) on a red background, fringed by a golden border in the style of a castle battlement. The blazon is: "Gules, ten Towers three two three two, all within a Bordure embattled Or".

The ten golden castles represent both the urban landscape of Greater Manchester, and its division in to its ten metropolitan districts: Bolton, Bury, Manchester, Oldham, Rochdale, Tameside, Trafford, Salford, Stockport, and Wigan. The red ground represents manpower and the region's red-brick architectural heritage, both legacies of Greater Manchester's industrial past. The embattled border represents the unity and shared future of the region, and its bold, vigilant and forward-looking character.

Usage

The flag has been reported to have been flown in front of the National Rail offices at Manchester Piccadilly railway station and in front of Rochdale Town Hall.

Greater Manchester Combined Authority

The current Greater Manchester Combined Authority does not use the symbols of the former Greater Manchester Council, instead using a wordmark consisting of its initials and full title.

References

See also
Coat of arms of Greater Manchester

County flags of the United Kingdom
Greater Manchester
Greater Manchester